Fernando Alves Machado (born December 25, 1981 in Pelotas, Brazil) is a Brazilian footballer currently playing for Sportivo Rivadavia of the Torneo Argentino B.

Teams
  Guarany de Bagé 2003
  Brasil de Pelotas 2003
  Deportivo Colonia 2004
  Real Arroyo Seco 2005
  Crucero del Norte 2005-2006
  Real Arroyo Seco 2006-2007
  La Emilia 2008
  San Luis de Quillota 2009-2010
  Everton 2011
  La Emilia 2012-
  Sportivo Rivadavia 2013-

Titles
  San Luis Quillota 2009 Primera B

References
 Profile at BDFA 

1981 births
Living people
Brazilian footballers
Brazilian expatriate footballers
Brazil international footballers
Crucero del Norte footballers
Everton de Viña del Mar footballers
San Luis de Quillota footballers
Chilean Primera División players
Primera B de Chile players
Expatriate footballers in Chile
Expatriate footballers in Argentina
Expatriate footballers in Uruguay
People from Pelotas
Association football forwards
Sportspeople from Rio Grande do Sul